Limahong, Lim Hong, or Lin Feng (Teochew , :, : ; March 7, 1499 – ?), well known as Ah Hong (Teochew , :,) or Lim-A-Hong or Limahon (Teochew , :,), was a Chinese pirate and warlord who invaded the northern Philippine Islands in 1574. He built up a reputation for his constant raids to ports in Guangdong, Fujian and southern China. He is noted to have twice attempted, and failed, to invade the Spanish city of Manila in 1574.

Origins
Wokou merchant-pirates became a serious problem along the China coast in the early 16th century.  Merchant-pirates such as Wang Zhi, Ye Zongman, Li Guangtou, and Xu Dong constructed large trading ships in Guangdong and Shuangyu, where they established clandestine trade relations between Japan, China, and Korea. Aided by the Portuguese, pirate activities peaked between 1553 and 1561, and included a raid in 1556 consisting of more than 20,00020,000 what?.  This clandestine trade extended to the Philippines, with Miguel López de Legazpi reporting in 1567, annual visits by Japanese and Chinese traders.  Increased Chinese navy patrols forced pirates such as Lin Daoqian to escape to Luzon, although temporarily.

Likewise, Limahon successfully attacked Shenquan in 1571, but was then defeated in 1572 at Chenghai, forcing him to flee to Luzon.  The Chinese General Liu Yaohui sent a fleet that temporarily drove Limahon from his fortified trading base on Luzon, but by 1574, Limahon was pirating along the Chinese coast once again.

Venturing once again back to Luzon, Limahon was able to capture a Chinese merchant ship engaged in trade with the Spanish.  Robbing this merchant of his gold and silver, Limahon learned more gold and silver was to be gained from the Spanish further south, and in the words of Francisco de Sande, "there would be no one with whom to fight."  Limahon's fleet of 62–70 ships, 3000 pirates, and 400 Japanese soldiers, set sail for Manila.  Along the way, Limahon encountered a Spanish galiot, sent by Juan de Salcedo for provisions while his force of 100 men were in Vigan.  The galiot was quickly overcome, the 22 Spanish aboard killed, and their falconet captured.  Seeing Limahon's true intent, Salcedo sent an advance force onwards to Manila, warning of Limahon's approach, and assuring everyone that Salcedo was on his way to help.

Attack on Manila

Arriving on Saint Andrew's Day eve, Limahon landed 700 of his men ashore the next day.  Clad in cotton corselets with bamboo helmets, but armed with pikes, arquebusses, battle axes, cutlasses and daggers, they proceeded barefoot towards the city, where they arrived by 10 am.  Fortunately for the defense of Manila, Limahon's men first had to deal with master of the camp Martin de Goiti, who lost his life.  This delay allowed Captains Velasquez and Chacon to bring forward men with whom to confront the pirates on the beach.  After suffering 80 casualties to the Spanish 14, the Chinese retreated to their boats, making their way to Limahon who had set up base in the port of Cavite.  Limahon decided to rest a day before proceeding with the attack.

In the meantime the Spanish were able to build a defensive palisade, and Salcedo arrived with 50 men.  By day break on the third day, Limahon's entire fleet appeared off shore and fired three volleys before putting men ashore to attack the Spanish fort.  About 80 Chinese were able to enter the fort but were immediately killed, forcing another Chinese retreat, but not before they were able to burn the San Agustin Church and a galley.  The Spanish also had to deal with a Moro revolt at the same time, after two Moro leaders were killed while in a Spanish prison.

Yet Limahon's men retreated once again and his fleet set sail for Ylocos, leaving behind more than 200 Chinese dead.  Consequently, the Moro revolt quickly ended.  The Spanish suffered three dead and several wounded.

In Pangasinan
Limahong retreated to Pangasinan, where he decided to settle, building a fort and counter fort.  The fort walls were made from palm logs, while the counter fort used palm planks.  Limahon was able to seize several nearby village chiefs, forcing the villagers to provide him with provisions.

Juan de Salcedo was made master of camp, a fort was built to better protect Manila, and plans were made to send an expedition against Limahon.  Salcedo's expedition of 256 men, with 2500 native allies, set sail on 23 March 1575, with 59 vessels commanded by Captains Chacon, Chaves, Ribera, and Ramirez. They arrived at Pangasinan on Holy Wednesday, 30 March.

Salcedo set about blockading the Agno River, landing men and artillery.  He then sent Captains Pedro de Chaves and Chacon up the river in nine small boats, with eight men each, to capture any Chinese boats.  Salcedo also sent Capt. Ribera and 28 men to assault Limahon's fort from the land side.  At the same time, 35 Chinese vessels were departing in a search for provisions, and when Limahon's men caught sight of the Spanish, they panicked, and fled to their fort.  Thus, the Chinese abandoned their vessels to the Spanish, who promptly burned them.

In the meantime, Capt. Ribera succeeded in gaining entrance to Limahon's fort capturing 100 women and children.  Yet, the approach of night forced the Spanish to retreat.  The Chinese were able to regroup and a long four-month siege ensued. Limahon made use of the time to build 30 ships within his fort.  On 4 Aug., Limahon set sail and made good his escape.

Shortly before the escape of Limahong, a Chinese fleet under Wang Wanggao (known in Spanish sources as Omocon), arrived to spy on Limahon.  Once Wang saw that Limahon was besieged, Wang departed for China with the news, taking along some of the Spanish, including some friars.

Aftermath
Limahong, and remnants of his forces, were able to join up with Li Mao and Chen Dele to pirate the South China coast in 1589.  After which, no more was heard from him.

Limahong's legacy to Pangasinan
Former Filipino President Ferdinand Marcos claimed to be a descendant of Limahong. This is impossible in analysis, and this could be a hint instead, that Marcos is 75% percent Chinese (coming from his alleged "Chinese father" and his mother Josefa's part-Chinese blood).

Popular culture
Limahong is mentioned in:

 Walter Robb's essay Walls of Manila.
 René Jouglet's adventure novel, La ville perdue (1936).

References

Further reading
Gambe, Annabelle R., Overseas Chinese Entrepreneurship and Capitalist Development in Southeast Asia (Munster, Hamburg and London: Lit Verlag, 1999).
Stearn, Duncan, Chronology of South-East Asian History 1400–1996 (Dee Why, NSW: The Mitraphab Centre Pty Ltd., 1997).
“La Relación del suceso de la venida del tirano chino del gobernador Guido de Lavezares (1575): Épica española en Asia en el siglo XVI:" Edición, transcripción y notas (incluye facsimil del manuscrito original), Juan Francisco Maura. Lemir (Departamento de Filología Hispánica de la Universidad de Valencia), 2004.
Morga, Antonio de. (2004). The Project Gutenberg Edition Book : History of the Philippine Islands – 1521 to the beginning of the XVII century. Volume 1 and 2.

External links
Limahong Monument
Don Galo Monument
Sumalakay si Limahong sa Maynila at Pangasinan

1575 deaths
16th-century Chinese people
16th-century pirates
Chinese pirates
People of Spanish colonial Philippines
People from Chaozhou
Year of birth unknown
History of Pangasinan
1499 births